Raiga can refer to:
Raiga Fujimura from Fate
Raiga Kurosuku from Naruto
Raiga From Raiga: The Monster From The Deep Sea (2009 Japan and 2020 America)